The Rucker's Bottom site (9EB91) is an archaeological site in located on the upper Savannah River in Elbert County, Georgia.

Site information 
Excavated and surveyed by a team of archaeologists from Commonwealth Associates, Inc., under contract from the Atlanta Interagency Archaeological Services Division of the National Park Service, the Rucker's Bottom site was occupied from the Paleoindian and Early Archaic periods through to the Mississippian Period. The original survey took place in 1970 and was followed by three field seasons of excavation from 1980 to 1982. The site was destroyed by the construction of the Russell reservoir.

The site spans 60,000 m².

Archaic occupation 
Paleoindian and Early Archaic deposits were examined through the excavation of a 160 square meter block, in 1x1m units. A Clovis point, and Hardaway Dalton, and some 28 side and corner-notched Early Archaic points were found.

Mississippian occupation 
The Mississippian period occupation lasted continuously from 1200 to 1500 CE, although the structure of the village changed substantially over time. The excavation showed a large number of structures as well as a plaza at the center of the town and a stockade surrounding the area. There was one large public house fourteen meters in diameter, the building shows similarities to historical accounts of public buildings that featured  fire pits at their center. Excavation showed several rock pits in the plaza that could have been used as trophy pits or as the basis for a game.

The stockade encircled the houses as well as the public spaces. On the North end of the site the stockade showed a row of posts 50 to 120 centimeters deep, a ditch was also uncovered around the stockade. Stockades are often used to defend areas from attacks during warfare.

The town would have been in a swampy area, possibly ox-bow lake, this would have given the residents access to both swamp and riverine resources. Adding these resources to agriculture would have provided a varied diet.

Over the three hundred year occupation the site changed significantly in structure. By the end of the occupation the residences were laid in a rectangular layout around the public square.

See also
 List of Mississippian sites
 Dyar site
 Joe Bell site
 Pisgah phase
 Summerour Mound site

References

Further reading
 Early Archaic Settlement on the Southeastern Atlantic Slope: A View from the Rucker's Bottom Site, Elbert County, Georgia 1983. (David G. Anderson and Joseph Schuldenrein). North American Archaeologist 4(3):177–210.
 Prehistoric Human Ecology Along the Upper Savannah River: Excavations at the Rucker's Bottom, Abbeville and Bullard Site Groups. 1985 (David G. Anderson and Joseph Schuldenrein, assemblers). National Park Service, Interagency Archaeological Services–Atlanta, Russell Papers.
 Prehistory and History Along the Upper Savannah River: Technical Synthesis of Cultural Resource Investigations, Richard B. Russell Multiple Resource Area. 1988 (David G. Anderson and J. W. Joseph). National Park Service, Interagency Archeological Services–Atlanta, Russell Papers.

South Appalachian Mississippian culture
Archaeological sites in Georgia (U.S. state)